Kojic acid is an organic compound with the formula .  It is a derivative of 4-pyrone that functions in nature as a chelation agent produced by several species of fungi, especially Aspergillus oryzae, which has the Japanese common name koji. Kojic acid is a by-product in the fermentation process of malting rice, for use in the manufacturing of sake, the Japanese rice wine.  It is a mild inhibitor of the formation of pigment in plant and animal tissues, and is used in food and cosmetics to preserve or change colors of substances. It forms a bright red complex with ferric ions.

Biosynthesis
13C-Labeling studies have revealed at least two pathways to kojic acid.  In the usual route, dehydratase enzymes convert glucose to kojic acid. Pentoses are also viable precursors in which case dihydroxyacetone is invoked as an intermediate.

Applications
Kojic acid may be used on cut fruits to prevent oxidative browning, in seafood to preserve pink and red colors, and in cosmetics to lighten skin.  As an example of the latter, it is used to treat skin diseases like melasma. Kojic acid also has antibacterial and antifungal properties.
The cocrystals of kojic acid with quercetin were found to have two times better cytotoxic activity to human cervical cancer cells (HeLa) and human colon cancer cells (Caco-2) in comparison with quercetin itself.

Other effects
Kojic acid has been shown to protect Chinese hamster ovary cells against ionizing radiation-induced damage. When exposed to a lethal dose of 3 Gy gamma radiation, dogs pretreated with kojic acid had a 51-day survival rate of 66.7% while the control group died within 16 days.

Chemical reactions

Deprotonation of the ring-OH group converts kojic acid to kojate. Kojate chelates to iron(III), forming a red complex . This kind of reaction may be the basis of the biological function of kojic aicd, that is,  to solubilize ferric iron.

Being a multifunctional molecule, kojic acid has diverse organic chemistry.  The hydroxymethyl group gives the chloromethyl derivative upon treatment with thionyl chloride.

References

External links
Safety MSDS data
 

Food additives
4-Pyrones
Primary alcohols
Enols